Sheldon Weinbaum: (born July 26, 1937 in Brooklyn, New York, United States) is an American biomedical engineer and biofluid mechanician. He is a CUNY Distinguished Professor Emeritus of Biomedical and Mechanical Engineering at The City College of New York. He is a member of all three U.S. national academies (National Academy of Sciences, National Academy of Engineering and National Academy of Medicine) and also the American Academy of Arts and Sciences. In 2002 when he was elected to NAM he became the sixth living individual to be a member of all three National Academies and the first to achieve this disrtinction since 1992. He was the founding director (1994–1999) of the New York Center for Biomedical Engineering, a regional research consortium involving the BME program at The City College and eight of the premier health care institutions in New York City. He has been a lifelong advocate for women and minorities in science and engineering. He was the lead plaintiff and organizer of a class-action lawsuit (Weinbaum vs. Cuomo) charging New York State officials with racially discriminatory funding of its two university systems, CUNY and SUNY, the first CUNY faculty recipient of the Public Service Award of the Fund for the City of New York, and the Inaugural Recipient of the “Diversity Award” of the Biomedical Engineering Society (2009). He was the inaugural chair of the Selection Committee that chooses the annual Sloan Awardees for the outstanding math and science teachers in the New York City public high schools and served in this position from 2009 to 2019. In 2022 he received the Benjamin Franklin Medal in Biomedical Engineerings from the Franklin Institute in Philadelphia.

Background and personal life 
Weinbaum was born and raised in Brooklyn, New York. His parents are Alex Weinbaum, who emigrated to the U.S. from Russia in 1921, and Frances (Stark) Weinbaum. He attended Jamaica High School, Queens, and Abraham Lincoln High School, Brooklyn, and received his bachelor's degree from Rensselaer Polytechnic Institute in Aeronautical Engineering in 1959. He earned his MS in Applied Physics 1960 and his PhD in Engineering 1963 from Harvard University where he was a Gordon McKay Prize and then National Science Foundation Fellow. His dissertation is titled “Natural convection phenomena in horizontal circular cylinders” and completed under the direction of George F. Carrier. He subsequently worked for the Avco Everett Research Laboratory and the General Electric Space Sciences Laboratory in Valley Forge, where he did research in high altitude aerodynamics. He developed what is now referred to as the Weinbaum-Weiss model of the high altitude laminar near wake. He became active in the anti-war movement of the 1960s and returned to academia in 1967 as an associate professor in the Department Mechanical Engineering at The City College of New York. He was promoted to professor in 1972, became a Herbert G Kayser Chair Professor in 1980 and a CUNY distinguished professor in 1986. Weinbaum married Alexandra Tamara Wolkowicz in 1962 and they have two children, Alys Eve Weinbaum and Daniel Eden Weinbaum.

Contributions to science and engineering 
Weinbaum is widely recognized for novel biomechanical models that have changed existing views in such areas as bone fluid flow and mechanotransduction (how bone cells sense mechanical forces), vulnerable plaque rupture (principal cause of cardiovascular death), the role of the endothelial glycocalyx in initiating intracellular signaling, microvascular fluid exchange, revised Starling hypothesis now referred to as Michel-Weinbaum model for capillary filtration, endothelial transport aspects of arterial disease, glomerular-tubular balance in the renal tubule, and bioheat transfer (Weinbaum-Jiji equation for microvascular heat exchange between blood and tissue). In each case he resolved a long-standing “mystery” by discovering either a new structure-such as micro-calcifications in the fibrous caps of vulnerable lesions or leaky junctions for transport of LDL across vascular endothelium- or a new function for a known structure –such as by demonstrating that the glycocalyx on endothelial cells senses the fluid shear stress of the blood flow and transmits it to the intracellular cytoskeleton. He has also proposed a new concept for a high speed train where lift is generated by a giant ski riding on a soft porous material in a channel with impermeable side walls.

Weinbaum has been instrumental in the development of the biomedical engineering program at The City College of New York and CUNY. In 1994 he and Stephen C. Cowin established the New York Center for Biomedical Engineering and in 1999 they introduced the new CUNY PhD program in Biomedical Engineering. This led to the creation of the Department of Biomedical Engineering in 2002 and an undergraduate degree program in this field.

Contributions to diversity 
Weinbaum is recognized as a pioneering advocate for women and minorities in science and engineering. As an untenured professor he was almost fired in 1969 for his role in supporting Black and Hispanic students in their takeover of the City College campus in their protest against existing admission policies. In 1977 he established the first summer outreach program at The City College for low income public high school students in science and engineering. In 1988 he received the Public Service Award of the Fund for the City of New York from Mayor Edward Koch for his role in recruiting women and minority faculty and students to the Grove School of Engineering.

His 1992 class-action lawsuit Weinbaum vs. Cuomo (lead article Metro Section of the New York Times) brought national attention to the alleged racially discriminatory funding of higher education in New York State. The initial positive ruling was overturned on the New York State Court of Appeals in 1996 on the grounds that the state did not have to fund its two university systems CUNY and SUNY equally provided neither university had racially biased admissions. Weinbaum then turned his attention to encouraging high achieving underrepresented minority (URM) students to go to graduate school and pursue a PhD in a series of grants from the Sloan Foundation and National Heart, Lung, and Blood Institute at NIH 1997–2013. The success of the latter program is described by Pulitzer Prize winning reporter Kenneth Cooper in “Diverse Issues in Higher Education”. In 2020 Weinbaum received the PAESMEM Award from the White House for his excellence in mentoring of underrepresented minority students.

Selected awards and recognition 

1959–61 Gordon McKay Prize Fellow, Harvard University
1961–1963 National Science Foundation Fellow, Harvard University,
1974 Senior fellow Scientific Research Council Great Britain
1988 Public Service Award Fund for the City of New York
1994 The Research Award of the European Society of Biomechanics
1996 Elected a member of the National Academy of Engineering
1996 Melville Medal (best original paper) American Society Mechanical Engineers
1997 Whitaker Distinguished Lecturer Biomedical Engineering Society
2002 John Simon Guggenheim Fellowship in Molecular & Cellular Biology
2002 Elected National Academy of Sciences
2002 Elected Institute of Medicine
2007 Woodruff Lecturer, Georgia Institute of Technology
2007 Sackler Lecturer, Tel Aviv University
2007 Tenth Anniversary Ascher Shapiro Lecture, M.I.T.
2007 70th Anniversary Lecture, Hong Kong Polytechnic University
2008  Davies Medal RPI (highest honor for engineering alumnus)
2008  Beckman Distinguished Lecture, University of Illinois
2009  Inaugural Diversity Award Biomedical Engineering Society
2012  Honorary Doctorate of Science, The City College of New York, CUNY board of trustees
2013  Elected to the American Academy of Arts and Sciences
2020  Presidential Award for Excellence in Science, Mathematics, and Engineering Mentoring

References

External links
Members of the United States National Academy of Sciences
Members of the United States National Academy of Engineering
Members of the Institute of Medicine of the National Academies
Members of the American Academy of Arts and Sciences
Guggenheim Fellows 2002
CCNY News & Events

1937 births
Living people
Members of the United States National Academy of Sciences
Members of the United States National Academy of Engineering
Members of the National Academy of Medicine
Rensselaer Polytechnic Institute alumni
Harvard School of Engineering and Applied Sciences alumni
Abraham Lincoln High School (Brooklyn) alumni
Fellows of the American Physical Society